Salvatore Adduce (born 14 February 1955 in Ferrandina) is an Italian politician.

In 2001 he was elected at the Chamber of Deputies for the 14th Legislature; and served at the Italian Senate from April 2006 to April 2008.

Adduce ran for the office of Mayor of Matera at the 2010 local elections, supported by a centre-left coalition. He won and took office on 13 April 2010. He ran for a second term in 2015, but lost to the centre-right candidate Raffaello De Ruggieri.

See also
2001 Italian general election
2006 Italian general election
2010 Italian local elections
List of mayors of Matera

References

External links

1955 births
Living people
Mayors of Matera
Democratic Party (Italy) politicians
Democratic Party of the Left politicians
Democrats of the Left politicians